Mamani is a surname, and may refer to;

Abdoulaye Mamani (1932–1993), Nigerian poet, novelist and trade unionist
Mohammad Reza Mamani (born 1982), Iranian footballer
Moisés Mamani (1969–2020), Peruvian politician
Elías Blanco Mamani (born 1962), Bolivian biographer
Isabella Mamani (born 1982), Aymara activist and politician from Chile
Roberto Mamani Mamani (born 1962), Aymara artist from Bolivia
Teobaldo Nina Mamani (born 1965), Peruvian painter and teacher
Freddy Mamani (architect) (born 1971), Bolivian architect
Freddy Mamani (born 1974), Bolivian politician

Other uses 
Mamani (album), 2002
Queen Mamani of the Amampondomise

Quechuan-language surnames
Aymaran-language surnames
Surnames of African origin